Sergei Anatolyevich Zimenkov (born 20 April 1952) is a Russian professional football coach and a former player.

Career
Zimenkov began his professional football career with FC Lokomotyv Donetsk before joining FC Dynamo Stavropol. He had a two-year spell with FC Kairat before re-joining Dynamo Stavropol in 1977. All together, Zimenkov scored more than 50 goals in over 200 league matches with Dynamo Stavropol.

References

External links
 

1952 births
Living people
Soviet footballers
FC Dynamo Stavropol players
FC Irtysh Pavlodar players
FC Kairat players
FC Shakhter Karagandy players
Russian football managers
FC Dynamo Stavropol managers
Russian Premier League managers
Association football midfielders